Philip Martin Rubenstein (August 3, 1940 – June 26, 1992) was an American film and television actor. He was known for playing the role of Frank Falzone in the American sitcom television series Working Stiffs.

Born in The Bronx, New York City. Rubenstein guest-starred in numerous television programs including Barney Miller, Taxi, Remington Steele, The Jeffersons, Archie Bunker's Place, ALF, Who's the Boss?, Hill Street Blues and Silver Spoons. He also appeared in films such as Mannequin, My Mom's a Werewolf, Tango & Cash, They Call Me Bruce?, RoboCop 2, Star Trek IV: The Voyage Home and Back to School.

Rubenstein died in June 1992 of heart failure in Los Angeles, California, at the age of 51.

Filmography

Film

Television

References

External links 

Rotten Tomatoes profile

1940 births
1992 deaths
People from the Bronx
American male television actors
American male film actors
20th-century American male actors